Radio Rentals was formed in 1930 in Brighton, Sussex, UK to rent out radio sets by Percy Perring-Thoms with a turnover in the first year of £780. It later offered televisions and ultimately video recorders for rent. In 1964, it merged with RentaSet, Joseph Robinson's similarly formed company. Then in 1968, it was acquired by Thorn Electrical Industries and joined with Thorn's DER chain (founded 1938) as part of Thorn Television Rentals (TTR) though the two companies were run completely separately with different staff and vehicles. In 1980, TTR and thus Radio Rentals became part of the merged Thorn EMI, and in 2000 it merged with Granada Limited to form Boxclever. The company still trades as Radio Rentals in Australia.

United Kingdom
Radio Rentals operated mainly in the UK, having started life in Boyces Street Brighton, Sussex, England. Growth of a public television service after the war encouraged more people to want TV sets but they were expensive, leaving an opportunity for companies like RR to offer them at a monthly rental price which was much more affordable. With the coming of colour services, initially only on BBC2, a further opportunity for renting was created. On 15 November 1969, colour broadcasts on both BBC channels and the ITV network became available from the main transmitter sites around the UK.  This led to a boom in rental of TV sets.

By the late 1970s, video recorders had appeared on the market but were expensive. Only 5% of UK households had video recorders in 1980. Radio Rentals elected to offer Baird branded JVC VHS machines from 1977 onwards. With the advent of satellite broadcasting in the 1980s, Radio Rentals offered a range of equipment for rent, enabling more viewers to watch both Sky Television services and British Satellite Broadcasting services (these broadcasters were later to merge and form British Sky Broadcasting).

They also offered a small range of white goods, mainly from Philips/Whirlpool.

At its peak, Radio Rentals claimed it had more than 2 million customers, over 500 shops and employed 3,600 technicians, 2,700 skilled installers plus a large ancillary staff. They had sales and service locations across the UK, the RR logo being a common sight on many High Streets.

The urge to rent instead of buy reduced as domestic electronics became cheaper and more reliable, with greater use of integrated circuits and improved design. The company went through many restructures, shedding staff and rebranding itself. In common with other rental brands, it could not sustain a viable business model and has ceased to trade, merging with Granada Limited's rental arm to form Boxclever.

Oceania

Thorn operates over 90 Radio Rentals stores within Australia, and 28 stores in New Zealand under the name DTR. Radio Rentals stores in South Australia trade under the name RR Rentlo Reinvented due to an independent business trading as Radio Rentals. An independently owned chain operates 19 stores within South Australia; however is not in any way related to Radio Rentals owned by Thorn Australia Pty Ltd.

The Australian branch of Radio Rentals began in 1937 with the opening of a single store on Market Street, Sydney. Since this date, Radio Rentals continued to expand and open stores across Australia, including the launch of 'Rentlo' in South Australia. In April 2015 Rentlo was rebranded to RR Rentlo Reinvented. Radio Rentals is a household appliance, technology and furniture rental service. Today, Radio Rentals and RR Rentlo Reinvented have more than 90 stores Australia wide and more than 500 employees. The Australian stores continued to trade under the Thorn Group, with James Marshall as the current CEO and managing director, appointed in 2014. On 23 April 2020, due to the COVID-19 induced retail downturn, Radio Rentals announced the permanent closure of its 62 bricks-and-mortar stores and selected warehouses, continuing as a purely online business.

In 2008, the Thorn Group, who operates Radio Rentals, launched Big Brown Box; an online retailer of brown goods and consumer technology gadgets. The site later expanded to include computers and whitegoods. Thorn Group decided to offload the business in November 2010, with the CEO, John Hughes, saying that while Thorn Group "still believes strategically in online and the potential of BigBrownBox.com.au" the company had to take a pragmatic view on the business given the group's limited resources. Big Brown Box was later purchased and relaunched by Appliances Online.

Centrepay controversy
In 2015, a report by Credit Suisse found that for the financial year 2014/15, A$90 million of Radio Rentals and RR Rentlo Reinvented Australia's total revenue of A$197 million came from payments made by government benefit recipients using the Commonwealth Department of Human Services direct debit Centrepay system. The report also stated that around half of this amount, approximately A$45 million, related to the purchase of entertainment items such as smart phones and televisions.

See also
BrightHouse (retailer)

References

External links
 Radio Rentals Australia

Electronics companies of the United Kingdom
Electronics companies of Australia
Electronics companies established in 1930
1930 establishments in England
1980 disestablishments in England
Defunct companies of England
Electronics companies established in 1937
Australian companies established in 1937
Privately held companies of Australia
British companies established in 1930